Saint George Freeing the Princess is a marble stiacciato bas-relief sculpture by Donatello, sculpted around 1416 or 1417. It was originally situated under the same artist's Saint George on an external niche of the church of Orsanmichele in Florence; both works are now in the Bargello Museum, with replicas replacing them in their original positions.

References

1417 sculptures
Sculptures by Donatello
George
Sculptures of saints